Elections to North Down Borough Council were held on 21 May 1997 on the same day as the other Northern Irish local government elections. The election used four district electoral areas to elect a total of 25 councillors.

Election results

Note: "Votes" are the first preference votes.

Districts summary

|- class="unsortable" align="centre"
!rowspan=2 align="left"|Ward
! % 
!Cllrs
! % 
!Cllrs
! %
!Cllrs
! %
!Cllrs
! %
!Cllrs
! %
!Cllrs
! %
!Cllrs
!rowspan=2|TotalCllrs
|- class="unsortable" align="center"
!colspan=2 bgcolor="" | UUP
!colspan=2 bgcolor="" | Alliance
!colspan=2 bgcolor="" | UKUP
!colspan=2 bgcolor="" | DUP
!colspan=2 bgcolor="" | Conservative
!colspan=2 bgcolor="" | PUP
!colspan=2 bgcolor="white"| Others
|-
|align="left"|Abbey
|bgcolor="40BFF5"|20.6
|bgcolor="40BFF5"|1
|16.5
|1
|16.5
|1
|12.0
|1
|15.2
|1
|8.7
|1
|10.5
|0
|6
|-
|align="left"|	Ballyholme and Groomsport
|21.2
|2
|20.8
|1
|7.8
|1
|6.5
|0
|8.8
|1
|0.0
|0
|bgcolor="#0077FF"|34.9
|bgcolor="#0077FF"|2
|7
|-
|align="left"|Bangor West
|bgcolor="40BFF5"|25.1
|bgcolor="40BFF5"|2
|21.0
|2
|9.5
|1
|9.3
|0
|2.1
|0
|8.2
|1
|24.8
|1
|7
|-
|align="left"|Holywood
|22.3
|1
|bgcolor="#F6CB2F"|31.0
|bgcolor="#F6CB2F"|2
|4.1
|0
|10.8
|1
|4.3
|0
|0.0
|0
|27.5
|1
|5
|- class="unsortable" class="sortbottom" style="background:#C9C9C9"
|align="left"| Total
|22.4
|6
|22.1
|6
|9.3
|3
|9.4
|2
|7.3
|2
|4.2
|2
|25.3
|4
|25
|-
|}

Districts results

Abbey

1993: 2 x UPUP, 1 x DUP, 1 x Alliance, 1 x UUP, 1 x Conservative
1997: 1 x UUP, 1 x Alliance, 1 x UKUP, 1 x Conservative, 1 x DUP, 1 x PUP
1993-1997 Change: UKUP and PUP gain from UPUP (two seats)

Ballyholme and Groomsport

1993: 2 x UUP, 2 x Independent Unionist, 1 x Alliance, 1 x DUP, 1 x Conservative
1997: 2 x UUP, 2 x Independent Unionist, 1 x Alliance, 1 x Conservative, 1 x UKUP
1993-1997 Change: UKUP gain from DUP

Bangor West

1993: 2 x UUP, 2 x Alliance, 1 x DUP, 1 x Conservative, 1 x Independent Unionist
1997: 2 x UUP, 2 x Alliance, 1 x UKUP, 1 x PUP, 1 x Independent
1993-1997 Change: UKUP, PUP and Independent gain from DUP, Conservative and Independent Unionist

Holywood

1993: 2 x Independent, 1 x Alliance, 1 x UUP, 1 x Conservative
1997: 2 x Alliance, 1 x UUP, 1 x DUP, 1 x Independent
1993-1997 Change: Alliance and DUP gain from Conservative and Independent

References

North Down Borough Council elections
North Down